Bruno Campese (born August 3, 1963) is a Canadian-born Italian ice hockey goaltender. He was selected by the Boston Bruins in the 12th round (249th overall) of the 1982 NHL Entry Draft. Until 2015, Campese was the general manager of the Prince Albert Raiders in the Western Hockey League (WHL).

Campese competed at the 1994 Winter Olympic Games, and also at the 1993,  1994, and  1995 IIHF World Championships, as a member of the Italy national ice hockey team.

In 2007, the Prince Albert Raiders of the Western Hockey League hired Campese  as their head coach, and on January 14, 2008, he took on the added responsibility as the team's general manager. On October 28, 2011, Campese relinquished his head coaching position to his assistant Steve Young, but continued as general manager for the Raiders.

References

External links

1963 births
Living people
Asiago Hockey 1935 players
Augsburger Panther players
Boston Bruins draft picks
Bracknell Bees players
Canadian sportspeople of Italian descent
HC Milano players
Ice hockey people from British Columbia
Ice hockey players at the 1994 Winter Olympics
Italian ice hockey goaltenders
Kelowna Wings players
Olympic ice hockey players of Italy
Penticton Knights players
People from Nelson, British Columbia
Portland Winterhawks players
Prince Albert Raiders coaches
Vegas Golden Knights scouts
VEU Feldkirch players
Western International Hockey League players